Padma Kumar Debbarma is an Indian politician affiliated with the Communist Party of India (Marxist). He was a member of Tripura Legislative Assembly from 1998 to 2018. In 2018 Tripura Legislative Assembly election, he was defeated by IPFT's candidate Prasanta Debbarma.

References 

1962 births
Tripuri people
Living people
Tripura politicians
Communist Party of India (Marxist) politicians from Tripura
People from Tripura